This is a list of number one singles on the Billboard Japan Hot 100 chart in Japan in 2013. The week's most popular songs in Japan, ranked by the Hanshin Corporation and based on radio airplay measured by Plantech and sales data as compiled by SoundScan Japan.

Chart history 
Issue date is from Billboard-Japan.com.  The date posted on the main Billboard.com site is usually five days later.

References

External links 
 Japan Hot 100 on billboard-japan.com by Hanshin Contents Link
 Japan Hot 100 2013 archive on Billboard.com

2013 in Japanese music
Japan Hot 100
Lists of number-one songs in Japan